Bourinot's Rules of Order is a Canadian parliamentary authority originally published in 1894 by (the younger) Sir John George Bourinot, Clerk of the House of Commons of Canada under the title A Canadian Manual on the Procedure at Meetings of Shareholders and Directors of Companies, Conventions, Societies, and Public Assemblies generally.  The title page states that it is an abridgement of the author's larger work, but it should be seen as a shorter re-write, dealing in considerable depth with public meetings outside and separate from the Parliament in Ottawa.  The fourth, posthumous, edition of the work was given the cover title of the present article. The document is widely used in Canada to set procedures for formal meetings in government, companies and other organizations.

Printings
The first three printings by the Carswell Company, Law Publishers in Toronto, are identical in title, text, and pagination.
1894, first edition, 1 p.l., [v]-viii, 444 pages
1911, second reprint, 1 p.l., [v]-viii, 444 pages
1914, third reprint, 1 p.l., [v]-viii, 444 pages
The fourth printing by McClelland, Goodchild & Stewart, Toronto, 1918, and prepared by Thomas Barnard Flint, was identical to the previous versions, except that it dropped the Fourth Part Church synods and conferences and the Fifth Part Municipal Councils, was re-paginated to viii, 208 pages and the title was changed to Rules Of Order being a Canadian Manual on the Procedure at Meetings of Shareholders and Directors of Companies, Conventions, Societies and Public Assemblies Generally.  This was the first printing to use Rules of Order in the title.
1918, fourth reprint, viii, 208 pages
The 1924 printing by McClelland & Stewart has the identical text and pagination, with minor changes to the numbering of the preliminary leaves, as the 4th printing, but Bourinot's name is added to the cover title as Bourinot's Rules of Order, most probably in response to the American publication Robert's Rules of Order. 
1924, Rules of Order: Being a Canadian Manual on the Procedure at Meetings of Shareholders and Directors of Companies, Conventions, Societies and Public Assemblies Generally, iv, [2], 208.

Bourinot's larger work, Parliamentary procedure and practice; with a review of the origin, growth and operation of parliamentary institution in the Dominion of Canada, and an appendix, containing the British North America act of 1867 and amending acts from which this was derived was first published in 1884 in Montreal by Dawson Brothers, with further editions in 1892, 1903, and 1916.

Bibliography

See also
Parliamentary procedure
Beauchesne's Parliamentary Rules and Forms
Robert Marleau, co-editor of the 2000 edition of  House of Commons Procedure and Practice
Robert's Rules of Order, popular American publication, 1876

References

External links
A Canadian Manual on the Procedure at Meetings of Shareholders and Directors of Companies, Conventions, Societies, and Public Assemblies generally. (No longer available as of 14 May 2022)

1884 in Canada
Meetings
Parliamentary authority
Publications established in 1884
1884 establishments in Canada